Carroll Van West is an American historian. He is the Tennessee State Historian and a professor of history at Middle Tennessee State University. He is the author or editor of several books about Montana and Tennessee.

Early life
Carroll Van West was born in Murfreesboro, Tennessee. He graduated from Middle Tennessee State University, where he earned a Bachelor of Arts degree in 1977. He earned a master's degree from the University of Tennessee in 1978 and a PhD from the College of William and Mary in 1982.

Career
Van West is a professor of history at his alma mater, Middle Tennessee State University, where he is also the director of the MTSU Center for Historic Preservation. He is the author or editor of several books about Montana and Tennessee.

Van West succeeded Walter Durham as the Tennessee State Historian in July 2013.

Selected works

References

Living people
People from Murfreesboro, Tennessee
Middle Tennessee State University alumni
University of Tennessee alumni
College of William & Mary alumni
Middle Tennessee State University faculty
21st-century American historians
21st-century American male writers
Year of birth missing (living people)
American male non-fiction writers